SiTime Corporation is a publicly traded fabless chipmaker based in Santa Clara, California that develops micro-electromechanical systems (MEMS), used for timing devices in electronics.

History
SiTime was founded in Santa Clara, California in 2005 by researchers Marcus Lutz and Aaron Partridge.

In 2014, the company was acquired for $200 million by Japanese fabless semiconductor company MegaChips.

In 2016, the company launched its Elite platform of Super-TCXOs (temperature compensated crystal oscillators).

In November, the company announced its Emerald line of MEMS timers designed for 5G equipment.

In November 2019, SiTime was spun off and went public. MegaChips is a shareholder that owns 25%. 

In August 2020, the company announced its Cascade family of system on a chip (SoC), its first clock chip product. In October, the company introduced ApexMEMS resonators, designed for high volume, space constrained applications. 

In January 2021, based on SiTime's 2020 stock gain, Investors Business Daily included the company on its list of the 100 best stocks of 2020.

In January 2022, CEO Vashist credited its relationship with its foundry partners and the small size of its chips for helping it avoid the chip shortages faced by other chip companies at the time, due to 2021–22 supply chain issues. In February, the company introduced its XCalibur line of active resonators.

Products
SiTime manufacturers silicon-based MEMS timing devices, used as an alternative to quartz timers in precision timing applications such as controlling the timing of electronic systems, managing electronic transfer of data, setting radio frequencies or measuring time. It provides MEMS resonators, oscillators and clocks.

The company's XCalibur line of MEMs-based active resonators are designed to replace quartz resonators.

The company's Elite Platform of Super-TCXOs (temperature compensated crystal oscillators) includes the Elite and Elite X. The devices are designed for harsh environments, such as with extreme temperatures, thermal shock and vibration.

The company's Cascade family is a MEMS clock system-on-chip (SoC), with an integrated MEMS resonator, oscillator and clock integrated circuit (IC).

The company also develops MEMs oscillators by integrating MEMS resonators with oscillator circuits and a phase-locked loop.

The company's Emerald platform is an oven-controlled crystal oscillator (OCXO), which includes an on-chip heater, for extreme temperature environments. The platform is designed for 5G networks and edge computing, where the equipment sits closer to customers, and must maintain precise timing in the face of environmental stressors such as airflow, temperature perturbation, vibration, shock, and electromagnetic interference (EMI).

Operations
SiTime is headquartered in Santa Clara, California. In its 2021 annual report, the company reported 279 full time employees in the United States, France, Malaysia, the Netherlands, Taiwan, Japan and Ukraine. It also reported its top customers as Apple, Fitbit, Garmin, Samsung, Google, Microsoft, Dell, HiKVision and Huami.

The company has three customer segments: The Mobile, IoT and Consumer segment develops high-volume, lower-cost devices for products like smartphones and fitness trackers. The Communications and Enterprise segment develops products for networking, telecom and data center products. Its Industrial, Automotive and Aerospace segment includes chips for electric vehicles, satellites and missiles.

German industrial company Robert Bosch and Taiwanese semiconductor company TSMC are the company's foundry partners.

References

External links
 

Semiconductor companies of the United States
Companies based in Santa Clara, California
Technology companies based in the San Francisco Bay Area
Technology companies established in 2005
Fabless semiconductor companies
2005 establishments in California
2014 mergers and acquisitions
2019 initial public offerings
Companies listed on the Nasdaq